The Kecskemét International Air Show is a two-day-long air show held since the early 1990s at the Kecskemét Air Base of the Hungarian Defence Force. In 2008, when the annual Royal International Air Tattoo was cancelled, the Kecskemét Air Show became that year's biggest air show held in Europe. It was last held in August 2021.

References

External links
 Official site of the Kecskemét Air Show in 2013, in english
 Pictures from the 2005 Air Show

Air shows
Trade fairs in Hungary
Kecskemét